Prince Konstantine Bagration of Mukhrani (1889 – 1915) was a Georgian nobleman from the House of Mukhrani. A member of the Russian Imperial Guard, Konstantine fought with distinction and died in World War I - actions for which he posthumously received the Order of St. George, the highest military decoration of the Empire. Konstantine was in a brief but controversial marriage with Princess Tatiana Constantinovna of Russia, a member of the Russian Imperial Family.

Family and marriage

Konstantine was the son of a Georgian Prince Alexander Bagration of Mukhrani (1856–1935), a descendant of the Georgian royal Bagrationi dynasty: Alexander was son of Mikheil (1831-1907), son of Constantine IV, Prince of Mukhrani. Konstantine's mother was Princess Nino Tarkhan-Mouravi (1869–1934), also of Georgian noble blood. He was born in Tbilisi, Georgia, at that time a part of the Russian Empire.

In the winter of 1910, Konstantin made acquaintance of his future wife Tatiana Constantinovna of Russia, from the Russian imperial House of Romanov, during a visit to one of Romanovs' estates. According to Prince Gabriel Constantinovich of Russia, Tatiana's parents were against her marriage to the Georgian prince, since the Georgian royal house of which he was part had not been a ruling house in some time and was not deemed equal of the Russian Imperial family.

To prevent the marriage, Tatiana's father, Grand Duke Konstantin Konstantinovich of Russia, demanded that Konstantine leave Saint Petersburg, prompting the Georgian nobleman to return to his hometown of Tiflis (Tbilisi, Georgia), and awaiting military deployment to Tehran. As a result of his departure, Konstantine and Tatiana remained apart for an entire year. Their love, however, withstood the time and distance. Due to Tatiana's stubbornness, three Imperial Family Councils were convened on the matter of marriage, with the participation of Emperor Nicholas II of Russia himself. The final outcome of these family councils was that the Emperor issued an order, allowing the couple to get married. Konstantine and Tatiana wed in 1911 at the Pavlovsk Palace in the presence of the entire imperial family.

World War I and death
Several years after his marriage, Konstantine entered World War I as part of the Chevalier Guard Regiment, and in 1915 was awarded the Gold Sword for Bravery due to his heroic actions in the course of combat and reconnaissance missions. Konstantine died in combat later that year and was awarded the Empire's highest military decoration - the Order of St. George. Konstantine's remains were moved to Mtskheta, Georgia's ancient capital, and buried at the Cathedral of the Living Pillar where many other Georgian royalty rest. Along the way, Konstantine's remains were saluted by a line of Russian Imperial troops, soldiers from all local educational establishments and the Cadet Corps.

Konstantine was survived by Tatiana and their two children:
 Teymuraz Bagration (1912–1992)
 Natasha Bagration (1914–1984)

See also
Leonida of Mukhrani, Grand Duchess of Russia

References

 Лейб-Эриванцы в Великой войне. Материалы для истории полка в обработке полковой  Париж. 1959
 Русский Инвалид от 18.7.15 за No. 158
 Воспоминания кавказского гренадера, 1914—1920. Белград, Русская типография, 1925. Попов, Константин Сергеевич
 Мемуары — В. К. Гавриил Константинович 
 Сайт Хронос.Окружение Николая II

1889 births
1915 deaths
Military personnel from Tbilisi
People from Tiflis Governorate
House of Mukhrani
Military personnel of the Russian Empire
Morganatic spouses of Russian royalty
19th-century people from Georgia (country)
Nobility of Georgia (country)
Russian nobility
Russian military personnel of World War I
Russian military personnel killed in World War I